is a Japanese karateka. She won a Gold medal in individual kata at the 2012 World Karate Championships after previously winning Bronze at the 2010 Championships. She also won Gold in the same category at the 2010 Asian Games. , Usami is coaching the karate team at Kokushikan University.

Early life
Usami was born on February 20, 1986, in Tokyo, Japan. She had said in an interview that she started karate when she was 10 years old by joining a Goju-ryu-style dojo located near her family's house in Tokyo, after seeing a female fighter on television. Her older brother had been practicing karate and let Usami wear his karate gi on occasions, so that helped her a lot when she decided to eventually start practicing karate herself.

Usami's first karate tournament was when she was a green belt at 12 years old in elementary school. Usami did not participate in big tournaments until age 15 and won her first tournament at 17 years old at the All Japan High School Karatedo Championships.

Achievements

Publications 
 Usami, Rika. "Interview 2011 ", . vol.65 no.14 (March 2011): pp.3-6. , .
 Japan best players-the medalist of the 21st WKF Paris. vol.2 "Kata." Tokyo : CHAMP. DVD video. .
 . Tokyo : CHAMP, DVD video. .
 Usami, Rika.
 "", Coaching clinic,  vol. 28 no.2 (February 2014) pp.28-31. .
 Usami, Rika; Waranabe, Yusuke (渡邊祐介). "", Matsushita Kōnosuke Juku, vol.21, January 2015, pp.26-29. .
 Usami, Rika ; . . Tokyo : CHAMP, Blu-ray disc. .
 Usami, Rika. , Tokyo : CHAMP, Blu-ray disc. 2018. .
 Usami, Rika. (2019) , Tokyo : CHAMP, Blu-ray disc. .

References

External links 
 Interview with Rika Usami
 2012 final championships video
  Rika Usami
 In the spotlight: Rika Usami - The Queen of Kata

1986 births
Living people
Japanese female karateka
Karate coaches
Shitō-ryū practitioners
Sportspeople from Tokyo
Kokushikan University alumni
Asian Games medalists in karate
Karateka at the 2010 Asian Games
Asian Games gold medalists for Japan
Medalists at the 2010 Asian Games
20th-century Japanese women
21st-century Japanese women